Virchow is a small lunar impact crater that is located on the northwestern interior floor of the prominent crater Neper. The latter formation lies near the eastern limb of the Moon, along the southern edge of the Mare Marginis. Observation of this area is hindered due to foreshortening, as well as libration effects. It was named after German physician Rudolf Virchow in 1979. Before, this crater had the designation Neper G.

Virchow has a distorted shape, with a somewhat polygonal rim, particularly in the northern half. The northwestern rim protrudes outwards, giving the crater an asymmetrical appearance. This section of the rim just makes contact with the inner wall of Neper crater. The inner walls of Virchow are relatively narrow, and the interior floor is nearly level and almost featureless.

References

External links
 LTO-63B4 Virchow — L&PI topographic map

Impact craters on the Moon